Kolom, also known as Migum, is a Rai Coast language spoken in Madang Province, Papua New Guinea.

References

Rai Coast languages
Languages of Madang Province